Charlotte Church is the self-titled second album, released in 1999, featuring the voice of the then 13-year-old soprano Charlotte Church. The song “Just Wave Hello” was prominently featured in the global campaign for the Ford Motor Company, and Church’s image was used to promote their lineup.

Track listing
"Just Wave Hello"
"La Pastorella" from Rossini's Soirées musicales
"Barcarolle" from The Tales of Hoffmann
"O mio babbino caro" from Gianni Schicchi
"Lascia ch'io pianga" from Rinaldo
"Guide Me, Oh Thou Great Redeemer" ("Cwm Rhondda")
"The Holy City"
"Plaisir d'amour"
"Summertime" from Porgy and Bess
"Ah! je ris de me voir si belle" ("The Jewel Song") from Faust
"Voi che sapete" (Tell me what love is) from The Marriage of Figaro
"She Moved Through the Fair"
"Songs My Mother Taught Me"
"If Thou Art Near"
"The Last Rose of Summer"
"Men of Harlech"
"Lullaby" (Roses whisper goodnight)

In some editions (e. g. the version emitted in Hungary), the album contains the "Silent Night" as well, as the 18th track of the album (though it is not mentioned in the track list or the textbook of the CD). It is probably similar with the same track on the third album of Charlotte, the Dream a Dream.

Charts

Weekly charts

Year-end charts

Certifications

Release history

References

Amazon.com: Charlotte Church: Music: Charlotte Church

1999 albums
Charlotte Church albums
Classical crossover albums
Sony Classical Records albums